Kaputt is an English alternative, indie four piece band from London, England.

KEXP Seattle made Kaputt's song "Water Makes The Blades Blunt" their 'Song of The Day' for 18 March 2008.

Discography

References

External links
 Kaputt's Official Myspage Page
 Live review from a recent Kaputt gig in Berlin, Germany

English indie rock groups